Lukomorye, Lukomorie or Lukomorje was a region in ancient Russian lands and is described and depicted not only in Russian sources, but also in different non-Russian old sources. Lukomorye is also prominent in Russian folklore. The Russian word itself is an old term for "bight" or "bay". In the word  "luk-o-mor-ye", "-o-" is an infix to connect two roots, "-ye" is an affix (in this case, of relative location), "luk-" is the root for "bend", "mor-" is the root for "sea". It can also be translated as "curved sea-shore" or  "inlet of the sea".

Middle Ages geography and Early Russian manuscripts

The toponym "Sea Bend" (лука моря, luka morya) and the derivations: lukomorye, lukomorians, etc., has been applied to various geographical locations. It is mentioned in The Tale of Igor's Campaign and the Russian chronicles. According to the chronicles Lukomorye was inhabited by the nomadic Polovtsy people, and the researchers locate it in the region north of the Sea of Azov, where Polovtsy lived in the 11th—12th centuries. These accounts are seen as a source of inspiration for Alexander Pushkin. In modern Russian culture the word Lukomorye is most commonly associated with Pushkin's fairy tale poem Ruslan and Lyudmila, starting with the line: "There is a green oak-tree by the lukomorye, …" (У лукоморья дуб зелёный, … ; U lukomorya dub zelyony, …).

The land of "Lucomoria" was also depicted in a number of antique maps of Siberia/Moscovia.  cartographers followed the descriptions of Sigismund von Herberstein in his 1549 Notes on Muscovite Affairs:<ref name="Herberstein">{{cite book|last= von Herberstein|first=Sigismund|title=Notes on Muscovite Affairs|year=1549|chapter=De Tartaris|chapter-url=http://www.hs-augsburg.de/~harsch/Chronologia/Lspost16/Sigismundus/sig_co04.html#03|quote=...quas populi Grustintzi & Serponovutzi mercantur, Hi a castro Serponovu Lucomoryae ultra Obi fluvium in montibus sitae nomen habent. Lucomoryae autem hominibus mirabile quiddam ac incredibile, & fabulae persimile aiunt accidere, quos in singulos annos, nempe XXVII die Novembris, quae apud Ruthenos Sancto Georgio sacra est, mori aiunt: ac vere in sequenti, maxime ad XXIIII Aprilis, ranarum instar, denuo reviviscere. ... Cossin fluvius ex montibus Lucomoryae delabitur. in huius ostiis Cossin castrum est, quod olim Knes Vuentza, nunc vero illius filii possident. Eo a Cossin magni fluvii fontibus, est iter duorum mensium. Porro ex eiusdem fluvii fontibus alter fluvius Cassima oritur, emensaque Lucomorya in magnum fluvium Tachnin influit: ultra quem prodigiosae formae homines habitare dicuntur, quorum alii ferarum more, toto corpore pilis horrent: alii caninis capitibus, alii prorsus sine collo pectus pro capite habent, longasque sine pedibus manus.}}</ref>

...which they barter with the Grustintzi and Serponovtzi : these latter people derive their name from the fortress of Serponov Lucomoryae, situated in the mountains beyond the river Oby. 
It is said that a certain marvellous and incredible occurrence, and very like a fable, happens every year to the people of Lucomoryae, namely, that they die on the 27th of November, which among the Russians is dedicated to St. George, and come to life again like the frosts in the following spring, generally on the 24th of April.
...
The Cossin is a river which flows down from the mountains of Lucomorya ; at its mouth is the fortress of Cossin, which was formerly possessed by the Knes Ventza, but now by his sons. 
From the sources of the great river Cossin to this point is a journey of two months. Moreover, from the sources of the same river, rises another river Cassima, which, after passing through the district of Lucomorya, flows into the great river Tachnin ; beyond which are said to dwell men of prodigious stature, some of whom are covered all over with hair, like wild beasts, while others have heads like dogs, and others have no necks, their breast occupying the place of a head, while they have long hands, but no feet. 

Giles Fletcher in his Of the Russe Common Wealth repeats the fantastic tale of dying/reviving Lukomorians.

See also
 Hyperborea

References

Fictional regions
Locations in Slavic mythology
Russian culture